"She's Dope!" is a song performed by American contemporary R&B group Bell Biv DeVoe. It is the opening track on the group's debut studio album Poison and serves as the album's fifth single. In early pressings of Poison, the song was simply titled "Dope!", but the title was changed due to the increasing drug epidemic among children at the time. The song peaked at #9 on the Billboard R&B chart in 1991. The EPOD Mix version of the song is the version used in the music video & released as a single.

Music video

The official music video for the song was directed by Lionel C. Martin.

Charts

References

External links
 
 

1990 songs
1991 singles
Bell Biv DeVoe songs
MCA Records singles
Music videos directed by Lionel C. Martin
Song recordings produced by Dr. Freeze
Songs written by Dr. Freeze